Yves Colleu (born 29 January 1961) is a French former footballer who played as a midfielder. He played in Division 1 for Saint-Étienne and Tours and in Division 2 for Angoulême and Quimper. He managed Rennes in 1996–97, and served as assistant manager to Paul Le Guen at Rennes, Lyon, Scottish Premier League club Rangers, and the Cameroon and Oman national teams.

References

External links
 Player profile

Living people
1961 births
French footballers
AS Saint-Étienne players
Angoulême Charente FC players
Tours FC players
Quimper Kerfeunteun F.C. players
Ligue 1 players
Ligue 2 players
French football managers
Stade Rennais F.C. managers
Rangers F.C. non-playing staff
Ligue 1 managers

Association football midfielders
Footballers from Brittany
Sportspeople from Ille-et-Vilaine